Oldřich Janota (born 27 August 1949) is a Czech singer-songwriter. He is known for incorporating minimalist and experimental techniques into folk music, as well as working with pre-recorded tapes.

Biography
Janota was born in Plzeň and studied journalism at the Charles University in Prague, graduating in 1975. Together with some other musicians, they founded the band Pentagram in 1977. He was a member of Mozart K along with guitarist and sitarist  and saxophonist  between 1978 and 1983.

His collected lyrics were published in the book Kytaru s palmou in 2015. An 8CD box set of his songs from the 1970s to the present was released in 2016, titled Ultimate Nothing.

In 2009, a 17-track tribute album Ztracený ve světě: A Tribute to Oldřich Janota was released to mark his 60th birthday.

Discography 
 Winter Days (1989)
 Oldřich Janota (1990, later reissued as Mezi vlnami)
 Neviditelné věci (1990)
 Jiná rychlost času (1993)
 Žlutě (1994)
 Sešité (1996)
 Podzimní král (2000)
 High Fidelity (2001)
 Jako měsíc (2003)
 Ora pro nobis (2009)
 Posvěcení nového měsíce (2011)
 Kojoko (2014)
 Ultimate Nothing (2016)
 Vzpomínáš, Méďo? (2022)
 Zatlankou (2022)

References

External links 

1949 births
Living people
Musicians from Plzeň
Czech singer-songwriters
Czech guitarists
Charles University alumni